Preferential voting or preference voting (PV) may refer to different election systems or groups of election systems:

 Ranked voting methods, all election methods that involve ranking candidates in order of preference (American literature)
 Optional preferential voting
 Instant-runoff voting, referred to as "preferential voting" in Australia and as "ranked choice voting" in United States, is one type of ranked voting method.
 Contingent vote (the top-two variant of IRV)
 Single transferable vote (referred to as "preferential voting" in Australia)
 Positional voting
 Borda count (the most common form of positional voting)
 Bucklin voting, which was sometimes known as "preferential voting" when used in the United States
Open list proportional representation, sometimes known as "preferential voting" in Europe and nations such as Sri Lanka, with preference votes used by the voters to express preference to individual candidates on the party list
 Proportional voting methods

See also
Electoral system
Weighted voting

Preferential electoral systems
Electoral systems
Proportional representation electoral systems
Instant-runoff voting